Khuk Khi Kai, also called the Chicken Dung Cell or Chicken Poop Prison, is a former prison in Laem Sing, Chanthaburi, Thailand. It was built in 1893 after the French occupied the area as part of the Franco-Siamese War. The square-shaped tower is made from red bricks and is 4.4 metres wide and 7 metres tall, with two rows of slits along the sides. The tower was abandoned after the French withdrew in 1904.

Prisoners were kept on the ground floor of the tower. Above them was a chicken coop. The floor between them was perforated meaning chicken faeces were able to fall down on the prisoners below, as a form of torture.

References

Tourist attractions in Chanthaburi province
Defunct prisons in Thailand
Fortifications in Thailand
Registered ancient monuments in Thailand